"Dreams-Come-True-Girl" is a song by musician Cass McCombs. It is the first track on his fourth album, Catacombs. The song, which was released as the album's first single on May 25, 2009, features vocals by Academy Award-nominated actress Karen Black.

Music video
The music video, directed by Aaron Brown and lensed by Ben Chappell, features McCombs and his band playing the song on a stage. This is intertwined with various shots of children doing things such as dancing, laughing, and skateboarding. The video also features guest vocalist Karen Black.

References

External links
"Dreams-Come-True-Girl" music video at YouTube
"Dreams-Come-True-Girl" at Discogs
Cass McCombs (official site)

Cass McCombs songs